Ram Dass Malangar was an Indian politician and member of the Bharatiya Janata Party. Malangar was a member of the Himachal Pradesh Legislative Assembly from the Kutlehar constituency in Una district. Malangar was Deputy Speaker of Himachal Pradesh Legislative Assembly from 1999 to 2003.

References 

People from Una district
Bharatiya Janata Party politicians from Himachal Pradesh
1947 births
2015 deaths
21st-century Indian politicians
Deputy Speakers of the Himachal Pradesh Legislative Assembly
Himachal Pradesh MLAs 1993–1998
Himachal Pradesh MLAs 1998–2003